The Canadian Film Centre opened the Slaight Family Music Lab in 2013, sponsored by the Slaight Family Foundation.
Every year a small group of promising composers and song-writers are invited to study under a distinguished composer.

The first mentor was Howard Shore, who composed the music for many films, including
Marc Jordan was the mentor in 2014.

References

Canadian Film Centre
Music schools in Canada